
The Military General Service Medal (MGSM) was a campaign medal approved in 1847 and issued to officers and men of the British Army in 1848.

The MGSM was approved on 1 June 1847 as a retrospective award for various military actions from 1793–1814; a period encompassing the French Revolutionary Wars, the Napoleonic Wars, and the Anglo-American War of 1812.  Each battle or campaign covered by the medal was represented by a clasp on the ribbon; twenty-nine were sanctioned and the maximum awarded to one man was fifteen.

The Duke of Richmond, who had fought at Waterloo, was chiefly responsible for the belated institution of the Military General Service Medal for all survivors of the campaigns between 1793 and 1814. He campaigned in Parliament and also enlisted the interest of Queen Victoria, who persuaded a reluctant Duke of Wellington that junior and non-commissioned officers and private soldiers deserved this recognition. Hitherto, only the Waterloo Medal had been awarded to all ranks, while senior officers could receive the Army Gold Medal for service in the Napoleonic Wars.

The MGSM was only awarded to surviving claimants. A combination of factors, including general illiteracy and limited publicity for the new medal, meant that many did not apply for it, with only about 10 per cent of those who served receiving the medal. While next of kin could not apply for a medal on behalf of a deceased relative, they did receive the medal in cases where the claimant had died between their application and actual award.

A total of 26,089 medals were awarded.

This medal and its naval counterpart, the Naval General Service Medal, were among the first real British campaign medals, issued to all ranks present at a battle or campaign. The earlier Army Gold Medal had been awarded to field and general officers for their successful commands; they were not eligible to claim clasps for the same battle on the MGSM. To distinguish between the two medals, the MGSM was referred to as the "silver medal".

Appearance
 Obverse: a left facing effigy of Queen Victoria with the inscription "VICTORIA REGINA" and the date "1848".
 Reverse: Queen Victoria standing on a dais, crowning a kneeling Duke of Wellington with a laurel wreath. Above is the inscription "TO THE BRITISH ARMY", with the dates "1793-1814" below.
 Naming: The name and regiment of the recipient is impressed on the rim in block Roman capitals.

Clasps
The following clasps were awarded. Although the medal bears the dates 1793 to 1814, no clasp was authorised for service before 1801, or between 1802 and 1805. A total of 21 clasps relate to the Peninsular War and three to the War of 1812. The medal was never issued without a clasp. The most awarded to a single recipient was 15.

 Egypt (Clasp authorised in 1850)
 Maida
 Roleia
 Vimiera
 Sahagun
 Benevente
 Sahagun and Benevente (If present at both actions)
 Corunna
 Martinique
 Talavera
 Guadaloupe
 Busaco
 Barrosa
 Fuentes D'Onor
 Albuhera
 Java
 Ciudad Rodrigo
 Badajoz
 Salamanca
 Fort Detroit
 Vittoria
 Pyrenees
 St Sebastien 
 Chateauguay
 Nivelle
 Chrysler's Farm
 Nive
 Orthes
 Toulouse

Notes

References

Bibliography

External links
Military General Service Medal Roll (1793-1814), compiled by Colin Message.

British campaign medals
British military medals of the Napoleonic Wars